The Supreme Court of Ingushetia is the highest legal tribunal of the Russian subject of Ingushetia, which lies to the west of Chechnya.

The Court has undergone a tragic period in the 2000s, with Deputy Chief Justice Khasan Yandiyev, being assassinated on April 13, 2008, and successor Aza Gazgireeva being assassinated on June 10, 2009.

References

Courts in Russia
Appellate courts
Courts and tribunals with year of establishment missing